The Mineta Transportation Institute is a research institute focusing on the issues related to intermodal surface transportation in the United States. Although part of San Jose State University's Lucas Graduate School of Business in San Jose, California, the headquarters is located at 210 N 4th Street, San Jose and is currently directed by Karen Philbrick. It is named after its founder Norman Mineta, who was the 14th United States Secretary of Transportation.

It was established by Congress in 1991 as part of the Intermodal Surface Transportation Efficiency Act.

References

External links
Official website

San Jose State University
Research institutes in California
Transport research organizations
Transportation in California
University subdivisions in California